The Slovenia men's national under-19 volleyball team represents Slovenia in international men's volleyball competitions under the age of 19 and is controlled by the Volleyball Federation of Slovenia, which is an affiliate of the Federation of International Volleyball (FIVB) and also a part of the European Volleyball Confederation (CEV).

Results

Summer Youth Olympics
 Champions   Runners up   Third place   Fourth place

FIVB U19 World Championship
 Champions   Runners up   Third place   Fourth place

Europe U19 / U18 Championship
 Champions   Runners up   Third place   Fourth place

Team

Current squad
The following players are the Slovenian players that have competed in the 2018 Boys' U18 Volleyball European Championship

References

External links
 www.odbojka.si 

National men's under-19 volleyball teams
Volleyball
Volleyball in Slovenia